John Gillette is an American politician. He represents the 30th district of the Arizona House of Representatives, alongside State Representative Leo Biasiucci.

Life and career 
Gillette was a real estate agent.

In August 2022, Gillette defeated Donna McCoy, Marianne Salem, William Hardt and Nohl Rosen in the Republican primary election for the 30th district of the Arizona House of Representatives. In November 2022, he was elected along with Leo Biasiucci in the general election. He assumed office in 2023.

References 

Living people
Place of birth missing (living people)
Year of birth missing (living people)
Republican Party members of the Arizona House of Representatives
21st-century American politicians
American real estate brokers